Christopher Rankin (1788March 14, 1826) was an attorney and politician from Pennsylvania, who moved to the Mississippi Territory in 1809. He was a delegate to the state constitutional convention in 1817, and was later elected as a U.S. representative for several terms, serving from 1819 to 1826.

Early life and education
Born in Washington County, Pennsylvania, Rankin attended preparatory studies at Jefferson College (now Washington & Jefferson College) in Canonsburg, Pennsylvania and graduated in 1808. He moved to Georgia, where he taught a village school and studied law at the same time. After being admitted to the bar in 1809, he began practice in Liberty, Mississippi.

Political career
Rankin was elected to a term as a member of the territorial legislature in 1812, serving one year. He moved to Natchez, Mississippi, in 1816 and practiced law. He was elected as a delegate to the state constitutional convention in 1817. That year he ran as an unsuccessful candidate for United States Senator in 1817 (the position at that time was elected by the state legislature). After that, he held several local offices.

Rankin was elected as a Democratic-Republican to the Sixteenth and Seventeenth Congresses, reelected as a Jackson Republican to the Eighteenth Congress, and elected as a Jacksonian to the Nineteenth Congress, serving from March 4, 1819, until his death in Washington, D.C., March 14, 1826. He served as chairman of the Committee on Public Lands (Seventeenth through Nineteenth Congresses). He was interred in the Congressional Cemetery.

See also

List of United States Congress members who died in office (1790–1899)

References

External links
 

1788 births
1826 deaths
People from Washington County, Pennsylvania
Washington & Jefferson College alumni
Burials at the Congressional Cemetery
Mississippi Democratic-Republicans
Democratic-Republican Party members of the United States House of Representatives
Jacksonian members of the United States House of Representatives from Mississippi
19th-century American politicians